Khadkewake is a village in Rahata taluka of Ahmednagar district in the Indian state of Maharashtra.

Population
According to the 2011 census, the population of the village is 1982, comprising 1,060 male residents and 922 female residents.

Economy
Most of the village residents are engaged in agriculture.  A Export Facility Center of Maharashtra State Agricultural Marketing Board for fruits and vegetables is located in the village.

Transport

Road
Khadkewake is connected to nearby cities and villages by village roads and the Nagar-Manmad highway.

Rail
Shirdi is the nearest railway station to village.

Air
Shirdi Airport is the nearest airport to village.

See also
List of villages in Rahata taluka

References 

Villages in Ahmednagar district